John Frederick Scobell (22 February 1844 – 8 July 1898) was an English first-class cricketer and clergyman.

The son of John Edmund Scobell, he was born at Plymouth in February 1844. He was educated at Marlborough College, before going up to Lincoln College, Oxford. While studying at Oxford, he played first-class cricket for Oxford University in 1865–67, making four appearances. He scored 73 runs in his four matches, with a high score of 44.

After graduating from Oxford, Scobell took holy orders in the Church of England. He was a chaplain in the British Indian Army at Calcutta from 1873, before returning to England where he was vicar of St John the Baptist's Church, Bognor until his death in 1898 at St Leonards-on-Sea.

References

External links

1844 births
1898 deaths
Clergy from Plymouth, Devon
People educated at Marlborough College
Alumni of Lincoln College, Oxford
English cricketers
Oxford University cricketers
19th-century English Anglican priests
English military chaplains
Cricketers from Plymouth, Devon